Nordine Ibouroi (born 30 July 1998) is a professional footballer who plays as a forward. Born in France, he plays for the Comoros national team.

Club career 
In May 2018, Ibouroi joined Ligue 2 side Auxerre on an amateur contract.

Career statistics

Club

Notes

International

References

1998 births
Living people
Citizens of Comoros through descent
Comorian footballers
Comoros international footballers
French footballers
French sportspeople of Comorian descent
Association football forwards
FC Martigues players
AJ Auxerre players
AS Monaco FC players
Championnat National 3 players
Championnat National 2 players
Footballers from Marseille

Tercera División players
Comorian expatriate footballers
French expatriate footballers
Expatriate footballers in Spain
French expatriate sportspeople in Spain
Comorian expatriate sportspeople in Spain